Simon Lazenby is a TV presenter and lead presenter of Formula One for Sky Sports.

Lazenby graduated from Durham University with a degree in Natural Sciences. At university he played as a scrum-half for the rugby club and also captained his college team, St. Hild and St. Bede. After working initially as a grain trader for a private firm in Lincolnshire, he obtained work experience at Sky through fellow Durham alumnus Mark Durden-Smith, eventually passing a screen test after some months as a runner. He began presenting for Sky Sports in 2002, where he was part of the coverage of live Rugby Union.

Lazenby has been the lead presenter of Sky Sports F1 coverage since the channel's inception in 2012 alongside former drivers Johnny Herbert, Martin Brundle,  Damon Hill, Jenson Button, Karun Chandhok, Anthony Davidson, Paul di Resta, and Nico Rosberg. Lazenby has not presented at two Grands Prix in 2020 - Natalie Pinkham was lead presenter for the 2020 Spanish Grand Prix and Rachel Brookes for the 2020 Russian Grand Prix. The channel has twice won International Broadcaster of the year since its inception in 2012. As of 2019, Lazenby has presented the live coverage of over 160 Grand Prix.

Lazenby has a wife and two children, and lives in Wimbledon in South West London. Lazenby plays golf and the piano.

References

Living people
Alumni of Durham University
Sky Sports presenters and reporters
Year of birth missing (living people)
Durham University RFC players